Bastian Pinske (born 19 September 1978) is a German footballer who plays for FC Brünninghausen.

References

External links

1978 births
Living people
German footballers
Borussia Dortmund II players
SG Wattenscheid 09 players
Kickers Offenbach players
FC Rot-Weiß Erfurt players
KFC Uerdingen 05 players
2. Bundesliga players
3. Liga players
Association football defenders